Murda may refer to:

Murda (rapper), Önder Doğan (born 1964), Turkish-Dutch rapper
"Murda" (song), by Candyland 2015
"Murda", a song Lil Wayne from Free Weezy Album, 2015
"Murda", a song by Chancellor and Dok2, 2016
Murda, a letter form in Javanese script

See also

Murder